The 2005 Palmer Cup was held on June 8–9, 2005 on the Irish Course, Whistling Straits, Haven, Wisconsin. The United States won 14 to 10.

Format
On Wednesday, there were four matches of four-ball in the morning, followed by eight singles matches in the afternoon. Four foursomes matches were played on the Thursday morning with a further eight singles in the afternoon. In all, 24 matches were played.

Each of the 24 matches was worth one point in the larger team competition. If a match was all square after the 18th hole, each side earned half a point toward their team total. The team that accumulated at least 12½ points won the competition.

Teams
Eight college golfers from the United States and Europe participated in the event.

Wednesday's matches

Morning four-ball

Afternoon singles

Thursday's matches

Morning foursomes

Afternoon singles

Michael Carter award
The Michael Carter Award winners were Matt Every and David Skinns.

References

External links
Palmer Cup official site

Arnold Palmer Cup
Golf in Wisconsin
Palmer Cup
Palmer Cup
Palmer Cup
Palmer Cup